The Nauru women's national basketball team is the women's team that represents Nauru in international basketball and is a member of FIBA Oceania. The national team is currently inactive in international competitive basketball, last participating at the 2001 Oceania Basketball Tournament in Fiji. Nauru initially planned to send a squad for the 2005 South Pacific Mini Games but withdrew due to undisclosed reasons.

References

Women's national basketball teams
Basketball Women